The 2017–18 Algerian Basketball Cup is the 49th edition of the Algerian Basketball Cup. It is managed by the FABB and is held in Algiers, in the Hacène Harcha Arena on July 5, 2018.

Round of 32

Round of 16
Draw on Saturday, February 24 at the headquarters of the Algerian Basketball Federation.

Bracket

Quarterfinals

Semifinals

Final

Notes

References

External links
basketalgerie.com

Algerian Basketball Cup
2018 in Algerian sport
Cup